Laodamas refers to five different people in Greek mythology.

 Laodamas, son of Eteocles, inherited Thebes from his father. In one version of the myth (different from the one recounted in Sophocles' Antigone), he was responsible for the deaths of his aunts Antigone and Ismene, whom he prosecuted for having buried Polynices. They sought refuge in the temple of Hera, but Laodamas set fire to it and thus killed them. During the battle of the Epigoni, he was killed by Alcmaeon after he killed Aegialeus. Other sources state that he survived and fled to the Encheleans in Illyria, and subsequently led an expedition to Thessaly.
 Laodamas, son of Antenor and Theano, thus brother of Crino, and numerous sons, including Acamas, Agenor, Antheus, Archelochus, Coön, Demoleon, Eurymachus, Glaucus, Helicaon, Iphidamas, Laodocus, Medon, Polybus and Thersilochus. Laodamas was a Trojan warrior killed by Ajax.
Laodamas, a Lycian killed by Neoptolemus during the Trojan War.
Laodamas, son of Hector and Andromache and brother of Astyanax. Unlike Astyanax, he was spared by the Greeks and stayed by his mother's side.
Laodamas, a prince of Scheria as son of King Alcinous and Arete of the Phaecians. He was the brother of Nausicaa, Halius and Clytoneus. Alcinous gives Odysseus Laodamas's chair, "whence he bade his son give place, valiant Laodamas, who sat next him and was his dearest". He is the most handsome of the Phaeacians, and the best boxer in the games held in Odysseus's honor. He and his brothers were also the winners of the foot-racing contest. Laodamas asks Odysseus to join in the games. After Odysseus is rebuked by Euryalus, he challenges any of the Phaeacians save Laodamas. Laodamas and Halius are the best dancers among the Phaeacians.

Notes

References 

 Apollodorus, The Library with an English Translation by Sir James George Frazer, F.B.A., F.R.S. in 2 Volumes, Cambridge, MA, Harvard University Press; London, William Heinemann Ltd. 1921. . Online version at the Perseus Digital Library. Greek text available from the same website.
Dictys Cretensis, from The Trojan War. The Chronicles of Dictys of Crete and Dares the Phrygian translated by Richard McIlwaine Frazer, Jr. (1931-). Indiana University Press. 1966. Online version at the Topos Text Project.
 Herodotus, The Histories with an English translation by A. D. Godley. Cambridge. Harvard University Press. 1920. . Online version at the Topos Text Project. Greek text available at Perseus Digital Library.
 Homer, The Iliad with an English Translation by A.T. Murray, Ph.D. in two volumes. Cambridge, MA., Harvard University Press; London, William Heinemann, Ltd. 1924. . Online version at the Perseus Digital Library.
 Homer, Homeri Opera in five volumes. Oxford, Oxford University Press. 1920. . Greek text available at the Perseus Digital Library.
Homer, The Odyssey with an English Translation by A.T. Murray, Ph.D. in two volumes. Cambridge, MA., Harvard University Press; London, William Heinemann, Ltd. 1919. . Online version at the Perseus Digital Library. Greek text available from the same website.
 Pausanias, Description of Greece with an English Translation by W.H.S. Jones, Litt.D., and H.A. Ormerod, M.A., in 4 Volumes. Cambridge, MA, Harvard University Press; London, William Heinemann Ltd. 1918. . Online version at the Perseus Digital Library
 Pausanias, Graeciae Descriptio. 3 vols. Leipzig, Teubner. 1903.  Greek text available at the Perseus Digital Library.
Publius Vergilius Maro, Aeneid. Theodore C. Williams. trans. Boston. Houghton Mifflin Co. 1910. Online version at the Perseus Digital Library.
 Publius Vergilius Maro, Bucolics, Aeneid, and Georgics. J. B. Greenough. Boston. Ginn & Co. 1900. Latin text available at the Perseus Digital Library.
 Quintus Smyrnaeus, The Fall of Troy translated by Way. A. S. Loeb Classical Library Volume 19. London: William Heinemann, 1913. Online version at theio.com
 Quintus Smyrnaeus, The Fall of Troy. Arthur S. Way. London: William Heinemann; New York: G.P. Putnam's Sons. 1913. Greek text available at the Perseus Digital Library.
 Tzetzes, John, Allegories of the Iliad translated by Goldwyn, Adam J. and Kokkini, Dimitra. Dumbarton Oaks Medieval Library, Harvard University Press, 2015.

Princes in Greek mythology
Kings in Greek mythology
Trojans
People of the Trojan War
Characters in the Odyssey
Phaeacians in Greek mythology
Theban characters in Greek mythology